Kahriz (also Romanized as Kahrīz; also known as Kahrīz-e Tūsak and Kahrīz Tūsk) is a village in Jowzan Rural District, in the Central District of Malayer County, Hamadan Province, Iran. At the 2006 census, its population was 188, in 51 families.

References 

Populated places in Malayer County